The Viramgam–Mahesana section belongs to Western Railway of Ahmedabad Division.

History
Viramgam–Mahesana section exists from Princely state time before Independence. Viramgam–Mahesana gauge conversion started during  1991 and completed after a long span of more than decade in  2005.

References

5 ft 6 in gauge railways in India
Railway lines in Gujarat

2005 establishments in Gujarat
Transport in Mehsana